Church Builders Killi and Nalli is a public sculpture in Raisio, Finland.

The sculpture, which stylistically depicts two humanlike figures, is based on a folk song for the kantele, according to which the giants Killi and Nalli built the church in Raisio.

The sculpture is thus based on a local myth, that the giants built the church in Raisio 700 years ago.

See also 
 Kukkarokivi
 Nunnavuori

References 

Raisio
Sculptures in Finland